Rami Jridi (born 25 April 1985) is a Tunisian professional footballer who plays as a goalkeeper for ES Tunis in the Tunisian Ligue Professionnelle 1.

Club career
Jridi started his career in the Espérance youth team when he was 11. He was promoted to the first team in 2006, where he made 6 appearances before moving to Espérance Zarzis for half a season in 2007, where he only made 2 appearances, before moving to Etoile Kram making 12 appearances in the league.

Jridi then was transferred to Jendouba and briefly to Gafsa, before making his move to Stade Tunisien in 2009. He has since been the first choice goalkeeper for his team, and his performances have merited a call-up to the national team.

International career
Jridi was first called up into the Tunisia national team in 2010, but did not make his debut until 2011. He now has 3 appearances, and is quickly becoming the first choice goalkeeper.

References

External links

1985 births
Living people
Tunisian footballers
Tunisia international footballers
2012 Africa Cup of Nations players
2017 Africa Cup of Nations players
Association football goalkeepers
Espérance Sportive de Tunis players
ES Zarzis players
EO Goulette et Kram players
Jendouba Sport players
EGS Gafsa players
Stade Tunisien players
CS Sfaxien players
Tunisia A' international footballers
2011 African Nations Championship players
2016 African Nations Championship players